Alishan Forest Railway is an 86 km network of  narrow gauge railways running up to and throughout the popular mountain resort of Alishan in Chiayi County, Taiwan.  The railway, originally constructed for logging, has become a tourist attraction with its unique Z-shaped switchbacks, and over 50 tunnels and 77 wooden bridges. Taiwan's Ministry of Culture has listed the forest railway as a potential World Heritage Site.

History

Japanese era 

The narrow gauge lines were originally constructed by the Japanese Colonial Government to facilitate the logging of cypress and Taiwania wood. Preliminary surveying was conducted in 1900 and route planning began in 1903, but the project was shelved in 1904 due to the Russo-Japanese War. In 1906, the Japanese Government contracted the Osaka-based Fujita-gumi to build the railroad. The company laid tracks from Kagi (Chiayi) to Rienryō (Liyuanliao) and imported 13-ton Shay locomotives to run on the tracks, but financial troubles and technical difficulties in construction in the mountainous terrain forced them to abandon the project in 1908. In 1910, the Japanese Government took interest in the abandoned railroad and decided to finish it themselves, also importing 18-ton Shays for the job. The tracks were extended to Alisan (Zhaoping) in 1913, marking the completion of the main line.

The Alishan Forest Railway became a major tourist railway when the tracks were extended to Niitakaguchi (新高口) in 1933. The station was located very close to Mount Niitaka (now Yu Shan), the highest mountain in Taiwan and the Japanese Empire, and the hike to the summit could be completed in nine hours. To cater to hikers, the railway operated an express service from Kagi to Niitakaguchi that only stopped at Shōhei; hikers would stay overnight at a  lodge at Niitakaguchi and summit the next day.

Since 1945
Diesel railcars supplemented the steam engines on the passenger services. In the 1980s, 10 Hitachi-built diesel-hydraulic locomotives were delivered and replaced the railcars and remaining steam engines.

The completion of the Alishan Highway in 1982 led to the loss of many rail passengers to faster and cheaper buses and the rail became primarily a tourist attraction.

Accidents on the line have resulted in a number of fatalities over the years. On 24 April 1981, a collapsed tunnel resulted in nine deaths and 13 injuries.  On 1 March 2003, 17 people were killed and 156 injured when a train derailed near Alishan Railway Station. On 27 April 2011, five tourists, including three from mainland China, were killed and 113 people injured in a derailment.

In addition, services have been repeatedly disrupted due to damages from landslides. The main line from Chiayi to Alishan has been partially closed since 2009 due to damages cause by landslides during Typhoon Morakot in 2009 and Typhoon Dujuan (2015). The line is undergoing repairs and is expected to be fully opened in 2023. In August 2015, the Chiayi-Fenqihu section was briefly closed due to damages during Typhoon Soudelor.

In order to further boost tourism in the region, on 5 December 2018 the Alishan Forest Railway commenced a "sister railway" partnership with Čierny Hron Railway in Slovakia, making the Alishan Forest Railway to maintain such relationships with nine other companies across five different countries.

Operation
The railway was privatized through a build-operate-transfer (BOT) in June 2008 and maintained by the Hungtu Alishan International Development Corporation. On 1 May 2013, the management of the railway was taken over by Taiwan Railways Administration. On 1 July 2018, the railway was taken over by the newly established Alishan Forest Railway and Cultural Heritage Office of the Forestry Bureau.

The system is currently operated using diesel locomotives, although there are occasional special public runs using the old steam powered Shay locomotives.

Lines

The main line originally ran from the city of Chiayi (elevation 30 m), to Alishan (elevation 2,216 m), but is currently partially closed past . The vegetation along the way changes from tropical to temperate and finally alpine. The line features many switchbacks on the way up the mountain.

Main line
–
Includes several steep gradients (max. 6.26%), a spiral and four switchbacks; longest line with most dramatic climate change.
The full line is expected to reopen by the end of 2023.

 Shenmu line
–First Reverse via 
Runs frequently all day, a short (5-minute) ride downhill to Shenmu station.

 Chushan line
Alishan–Chushan
Early morning trains, popular for viewing the sunrise over Jade Mountain

 Zhaoping line
Alishan–
Runs frequently all day, a short (5-minute) ride uphill to Zhaoping station

Mianyue line
Alishan–Shihou
Closed due to earthquake damage and typhoon, currently turned to mountain trail, reconstruction plans under discussion.

Shuishan line
Alishan–Shuishan
No passenger service, mountain trail only

List of stations

Alishan line (Main line)

Chushan line

Mianyue line

Tribute
On 10 March 2018, Google celebrated the Alishan Forest Railway with a Google Doodle.

See also
 Rail transport in Taiwan
 Alishan National Scenic Area
 Alishan Forestry Railway https://zh.wikipedia.org/

References

External links

Alishan Forest Railway 
Alishan Forest Railway Official web site
Alishan Forest Railway　(Hungtu Alishan)  
Alishan Forest Railway and Cultural Heritage Office 

 
Railway lines opened in 1912
1912 establishments in Taiwan